Owlad-e Darbandkabud (also Romanized as Owlād-e Darbandkabūd; also known as Owlād) is a village in Zirtang Rural District, Kunani District, Kuhdasht County, Lorestan Province, Iran. At the 2006 census, its population was 254, in 48 families.

References 

Towns and villages in Kuhdasht County